The Petit-Saut Dam is a gravity dam on the Sinnamary River about  south of Sinnamary in French Guiana. The primary purpose of the dam is to produce hydroelectric power and it supports a 116 MW power station. Construction on the dam and power station began in July 1989 and placement of concrete for the dam started in July 1992. The dam was complete in February 1993 and the first generator was operational in January 1994. The last went online in 1995. It is owned by Électricité de France. Construction of the dam and impounding of its large  reservoir led to several environmental issues that continue to be monitored and addressed. These issues include deforestation, greenhouse gases and water deoxidation.

References

External links

Gravity dams
Hydroelectric power stations in France
Dams completed in 1993
Energy infrastructure completed in 1994
Dams in French Guiana
Roller-compacted concrete dams
1993 establishments in French Guiana
Buildings and structures in Sinnamary